= Omar el Sayed =

Omer el Sayed entered Canada in August 1998 on a forged Dutch passport and told Canadian immigration officer Paul Kyba that he had fled Hezbollah to Germany, to come to Canada to seek asylum.

He settled in Edmonton, Alberta under the false surname Rahyn, and received social security and bank cards registered to his fake identity before a fingerprint match determined that he was fleeing German drug trafficking and firearms charges. He was arrested by the Royal Canadian Mounted Police (RCMP) the following year, but was released on $7,500 bail in 2002.
